Charles Geldart "Gillie" Wilson (9 January 1869 – 28 June 1952) was an Australian first-class cricketer who represented Victoria and played with Otago and Wellington in New Zealand. He also played Australian rules football for St Kilda in the early Victorian Football League (VFL).

The first part of Wilson's sporting career took place in Victoria, where he had played football with St Kilda since 1887, when they were competing in the VFA. Recruited from Hawksburn originally, Wilson played two senior VFL games, the first came in the inaugural season in 1897 against Geelong at Corio Oval and the other at Junction Oval in 1900 against Melbourne. He later served as a club secretary. While a St Kilda player he made three first-class cricket appearances for his state, as a right-handed batsman, all in the 1890s against Tasmania.

Wilson moved to New Zealand in 1902 after his football career finished, and became manager of the Invercargill branch of Sargood, Son and Ewen, a New Zealand warehousing and manufacturing company. He made his first-class debut in New Zealand when he took the field for the South Island against Lord Hawke's XI at Dunedin in 1902–03. He was the first player to score a century for Southland, which he did against Otago in 1903–04 with 117 not out. He was transferred in his work to Dunedin in 1905, and from 1905 to 1912 he represented Otago in the Plunket Shield and other first-class cricket fixtures, captaining the team most of the time and serving on the Otago cricket Association executive from 1907 to 1912. He then moved to Wellington where he played for the province until his retirement in 1920.

He had his best summer in 1908–09, when he scored 429 first-class runs at 71.50 with two hundreds. One of those hundreds was an innings of 188 against Hawke's Bay, where he was captain and opened the batting. He followed it up with 49 in the second innings.

He was married in Windsor, Melbourne, in May 1892.

References

External links 
 
 

1869 births
1952 deaths
Australian cricketers
Victoria cricketers
Otago cricketers
Wellington cricketers
Australian rules footballers from Victoria (Australia)
St Kilda Football Club players
South Island cricketers